Between Love and Hate (also known as The Unbearable Lightness of Dating) is a 2006 South Korean film starring Kim Seung-woo and Jang Jin-young, and is the directorial debut of screenwriter Kim Hae-gon. Jang's performance won her Best Actress at the 2006 Korean Film Awards. This would be Jang Jin-young's final film before her death almost 3 years later.

Plot 
Young-woon works in his mother's restaurant, and is more interested in having a good time with his friends than settling down with his fiancée. He allows himself to be seduced by bargirl Yeon-ah, and the two embark on a tumultuous love-hate relationship. But when Young-woon's mother finds out about the affair and pushes him into marrying his fiancée, he is forced into choosing between the two women.

Cast 
 Kim Seung-woo as Young-woon
 Jang Jin-young as Yeon-ah
 Sunwoo Yong-nyeo as Young-woon's mother
 Kim Sang-ho as Director Jeon
 Nam Sung-jin as Joon-hee
 Jung Soo-hyung as Min-gu
 Oh Jung-se as Tae-gu
 Oh Dal-su as Hak-yi
 Tak Jae-hoon as Joon-yong

References

External links 
  
 
 
 

2006 films
2006 romantic comedy-drama films
2000s Korean-language films
South Korean romantic comedy-drama films
2006 directorial debut films
2000s South Korean films